Ruvu Shooting Stars is a football club based in Dar es Salaam, Tanzania. They play at the Uhuru Stadium in the Tanzanian Premier League.

They primarily wear blue with yellow trim kits.

References

External links
Club logo

Football clubs in Tanzania